The 1988 Geneva Open was a men's tennis tournament played on outdoor clay courts that was part of the 1988 Nabisco Grand Prix. It was played at Geneva in Switzerland from 19 September through 26 September 1988. Unseeded Marián Vajda won the single title.

Finals

Singles

 Marián Vajda defeated  Kent Carlsson 6–4, 6–4
 It was Vajda's only singles title of the year and the 2nd and last of his career.

Doubles

 Mansour Bahrami /  Tomáš Šmíd defeated  Gustavo Luza /  Guillermo Pérez Roldán 6–4, 6–3
 It was Bahrami's only title of the year and the 1st of his career. It was Šmíd's 1st title of the year and the 59th of his career.

References

External links
 ITF tournament edition details

 
20th century in Geneva
September 1988 sports events in Europe